Javarem (also Romanized as Javārem; also known as Jowvārem) is a village in Sorkhkola Rural District, in the Central District of Savadkuh County, Mazandaran Province, Iran. At the 2006 census, its population was 42, in 9 families.

References 

Populated places in Savadkuh County